Denise Borino-Quinn (January 6, 1964 – October 27, 2010) was an American television actress known for her recurring role as Ginny Sacramoni, the wife of New York mob boss Johnny Sack in the television series The Sopranos.

Early life
She was born in Roseland, New Jersey, on January 6, 1964. She attended West Essex High School.

Career 
Borino-Quinn worked as a legal assistant in the New Brunswick, New Jersey, office of the law firm Hoagland, Longo, Moran, Dunst & Doukas, LLP.

In 2000, Borino-Quinn attended the casting call for The Sopranos in Harrison, New Jersey, for the role of Ginny Sacramoni, the wife of New York mob boss Johnny Sacramoni, to support a friend. Borino-Quinn appeared in 17 episodes of the series.

Personal life 
After The Sopranos ended in 2007, Borino-Quinn lost 175 pounds via stomach stapling. She married Luke Quinn, Jr. in 2005, and they lived in Bordentown, New Jersey. He died in March 2010. She died seven months after her husband, from liver cancer, on October 27, 2010, aged 46.

References

External links

1964 births
2010 deaths
Actresses from New Jersey
American television actresses
Deaths from cancer in New Jersey
Deaths from liver cancer
People from Roseland, New Jersey
Burials at Gate of Heaven Cemetery (East Hanover, New Jersey)
West Essex High School alumni
21st-century American women